The Tankeng Dam is a concrete-face rock-fill embankment dam on the Ou River located  west of Qingtian, Zhejiang Province, China. The main purpose of the dam is hydroelectric power generation but it also provides for flood control, irrigation, and tourism. The power station contains 3 x 200 MW Francis turbine-generators for a total installed capacity of 600 MW. The dam was planned beginning in the early 1980s and approved in May 2003. Construction on the dam began that same year and in April 2008, the dam began to impound the river. On 15 August 2008, the first generator became operational, the second on 12 January 2009 and the third on 10 July 2009.

During construction, ten towns and eighty villages were submerged and over fifty thousand people were relocated.

See also

List of dams and reservoirs in China
List of tallest dams in the world
List of major power stations in Zhejiang

References

Dams in China
Hydroelectric power stations in Zhejiang
Concrete-face rock-fill dams
Dams completed in 2008